Shehzaade (transl. Princes) is a 1989 Bollywood film directed by Raj N. Sippy and produced Rajan Sippy, starring Dharmendra (in a dual role) & Shatrughan Sinha, Kimi Katkar and Dimple Kapadia.

Plot
Suraj Singh (Shatrughan Sinha) lives with his widowed mother in a small hut in a Bombay city slum. He cannot stand injustice in any form and manner, and this places him in the bad books of Police Inspector Shankar Shrivastav (Dharmendra). One day Suraj comes across an older male named Zorawar (Dharmendra in a double role), he feels sorry for him, and brings him home to live with them. What Suraj does not know that Zorawar is a former jailbird, who has completed his sentence - which was for multiple murders and a rape of a woman named Gauri Shrivastav, who had vowed to kill Zorawar by any means possible. Although Gauri is no longer alive, her vow to avenge the death of her and her rape, are still alive and raging in  her Police Inspector brother, Shankar. To complicate matters further, Suraj finds out that his mother, Padmini, is having an affair with Zorawar. What will Suraj do under these circumstances, will he take steps to oust Zorawar and alert Shankar?

Cast

Soundtrack
Lyrics: Anand Bakshi

References

External links
 

1989 films
1980s Hindi-language films
Films scored by Laxmikant–Pyarelal
Films directed by Raj N. Sippy